Kasper Wiksten (born 9 June 1980, in Hvidovre Municipality) is a Danish curler.

At the national level, he is Danish men's champion curler (2020), Danish mixed doubles champion curler (2020) and a four-time Danish junior champion curler (1996, 1998, 1999, 2000).

Teams

Men's

Mixed doubles

Personal life 
Natalie was the youngest player in history of all "adult" world curling championships) and won gold on 2020 Danish MD championship.

References

External links

 Wiksten, Kasper  | Nordic Junior Curling Tour (as a coach)
 Kasper Wiksten og - Go-Talent DK

Living people
1980 births
People from Hvidovre Municipality
Danish male curlers
Danish curling champions
Curlers at the 2022 Winter Olympics
Olympic curlers of Denmark
Sportspeople from the Capital Region of Denmark